is a Japanese actor and model, who is represented by Box Corporation.

Filmography

TV series

Films

Advertisements

Direct-to-video

Music videos

Stage shows

Video games

Magazines

References

External links
 

1990 births
Living people
Actors from Kagoshima Prefecture
Japanese male film actors
Japanese male models
Japanese male stage actors
Japanese male television actors
21st-century Japanese male actors